Janthinea is a genus of moths of the family Noctuidae.

Species
 Janthinea divalis Staudinger, 1891
 Janthinea friwaldszkii (Duponchel, 1835)

References
Natural History Museum Lepidoptera genus database
Janthinea at funet 

Hadeninae